The France national under-19 speedway team is the national under-19 motorcycle speedway team of France and is controlled by the French Motorcycling Federation.

World championships

Speedway World Cup

Speedway of Nations

European Championships

Pairs

See also
 France national under-21 speedway team (U-19)
 France national long track team
 motorcycle speedway

National speedway teams
Speedway
Speedway